Gary Jones (born 6 April 1969) is an English former footballer who played over three hundred times in the Football League principally for Southend United, Notts County and Halifax Town.

Playing career

Return to non-league
He joined Nuneaton Borough ahead of the 2002–2003 season before moving on to Hucknall Town and Gainsborough Trinity. In the summer of 2003 he linked up with Armthorpe Welfare. In November 2006 he joined Selby Town before returning to Armthorpe Welfare the following season. In July 2009 he joined Winterton Rangers, scoring twice on his Northern Counties East League debut for the club in the 4–0 victory at Rainworth Miners Welfare on 8 August 2009.
He retired from playing in November 2009.

References

External links

Lincoln City F.C. Official Archive Profile

1969 births
Living people
Footballers from Huddersfield
English footballers
Association football forwards
Rossington Main F.C. players
Doncaster Rovers F.C. players
Grantham Town F.C. players
Kettering Town F.C. players
Boston United F.C. players
Southend United F.C. players
Lincoln City F.C. players
Notts County F.C. players
Scunthorpe United F.C. players
Hartlepool United F.C. players
Halifax Town A.F.C. players
Nuneaton Borough F.C. players
Hucknall Town F.C. players
Gainsborough Trinity F.C. players
Armthorpe Welfare F.C. players
Selby Town F.C. players
Winterton Rangers F.C. players
English Football League players